The Challenger is a family of  mid-sized business jets produced by Canadair, and later by Bombardier Aerospace.

Aircraft include:
 Bombardier Challenger 600 series, the original family of business jets, with the CL-600, CL-601, CL-604, and CL-605
 Bombardier Challenger 300, business jet, originally called the Bombardier Continental
 Bombardier Challenger 800/850, a business jet derived from the CRJ-200

Challenger
Challenger